Natasha Ndowa (born 3 January 1998) is a Zimbabwean footballer who plays as a forward for Blue Swallows FC and the Zimbabwe women's national team.

Club career
Ndowa has played for Blue Swallows in Zimbabwe.

International career
Ndowa capped for Zimbabwe at senior level during the 2021 COSAFA Women's Championship.

References

1998 births
Living people
Zimbabwean women's footballers
Women's association football forwards
Zimbabwe women's international footballers